Tony Phillips (1959–2016) was an American baseball player.

Tony Phillips may also refer to:

Toni Phillips, British disc jockey
Tony Phillips (painter) (born 1961), British painter